Ryan Carrethers (born February 26, 1991) is a former American football defensive tackle. He was drafted by the San Diego Chargers in the fifth round of the 2014 NFL Draft. He played college football at Arkansas State.

College career
In 2013, Carrethers was a preseason first-team Sun Belt player.

Professional career
Carrethers was selected by the San Diego Chargers in the 5th round of the 2014 NFL Draft. He was released on October 5, 2016 and was signed to the practice squad two days later. He was promoted back to the active roster on December 3, 2016.

On September 2, 2017, Carrethers was waived by the Chargers.

References

External links
Arkansas State Red Wolves bio
Los Angeles Chargers bio

1991 births
Living people
American football defensive tackles
Arkansas State Red Wolves football players
Los Angeles Chargers players
Players of American football from Nashville, Tennessee
San Diego Chargers players